The  was a cabinet-level ministry in the government of the Empire of Japan from 1881-1925. It was briefly recreated as the  during World War II

History
The original Ministry of Agriculture and Commerce was created on April 7, 1881, initially under the Meiji Daijō-kan Cabinet, and then re-established under the Meiji Constitution. It combined the Bureaus of Agriculture, Forestry, Natural History and post station maintenance which were formerly directly under the Prime Minister with the Bureau of Commerce formerly under the control of the Ministry of Finance. The new Ministry was tasked by the Meiji oligarchy with improving production of natural resources and promoting the rapid industrialization of Japan. Although nominally its duties included the protection of workers, in reality it served the needs of industry by guaranteeing a stable labor supply. On December 25, 1885, with the abolishment of the Ministry of Industry, the Ministry of Agriculture and Commerce gained the Bureau of Mines and the Bureau of Civil Engineering. On April 1, 1896 a decision was made to denationalize the iron and steel industry. All government-owned steel mills were divested to private enterprise by February 5, 1901.

The Ministry was instrumental in passing the Japanese Factory Act of 1903, which reformed and regulated labor conditions in factories. On April 1, 1925, the Ministry of Agriculture and Commence was divided into the Ministry of Agriculture and Forestry, and the Ministry of Commerce and Industry. The division was a result of long-standing acrimony within the ministry between the “commerce” portion of the ministry, which sought expanded overseas trade, and the protectionist “agriculture” portion of the ministry which sought to ban imports of food, especially rice. In the aftermath of the Rice Riots of 1918, expanded imports of rice into Japan financially ruined many farmers, and the inherently conflicting goals of the two halves of the ministry became apparent.

However, during World War II, the Ministry of Munitions,  and the  absorbed most of the functions of the Ministry of Commerce, and the vestigial remains were merged with the Ministry of Agriculture and Forestry to re-establish the Ministry of Agriculture and Commerce on November 1, 1943.  In addition to promoting agriculture, the re-formed ministry was also in charge of distribution of rationed goods.

The Ministry was abolished on August 26, 1945, after the surrender of Japan by order of the Supreme Commander of the Allied Powers. In the post-war Showa Constitution, the ministries were again divided into the Ministry of Agriculture and Forestry and Ministry of Commerce.

Ministers of Agriculture and Commerce (Meiji-Taisho)

Ministers of Agriculture and Commerce (World War II)

See also
Agriculture in the Empire of Japan

References

Agriculture and Commerce
Politics of the Empire of Japan
1881 establishments in Japan
1945 disestablishments in Japan